Ornament is a Hong Kong football club which currently competes in the Hong Kong Third Division. Formed in 1948 by HK Gold & Silver Ornament Workers and Merchants General Union, the club has competed as high as the second tier of Hong Kong football.

History
In the 1986–1987 season, Ornament was the bottom team of Hong Kong Third B Division League. According to the rules, Ornament would have been disqualified for a year however, Ornament requested a waiver of this requirement and The Hong Kong Football Association later accepted the request.

In the 2001–2002 season, Ornament was placed the second in the Third Division, having been promoted to the Hong Kong Second Division.

In the 2004–2005 season, Ornament was placed 11th of the 12 teams in the Second Division, having relegated to the Hong Kong Third Division League after competing 3 seasons in the Hong Kong Second Division League.

In the 2010–2011 season, Ornament was placed 17th of the 19 teams in the Hong Kong Third A Division League.

References

External links
HKFA Club Info

Football clubs in Hong Kong
Hong Kong Third Division League
1948 establishments in Hong Kong